Are You Loathsome Tonight? (also titled Self-Made Man) is a collection of short stories by American author Poppy Z. Brite, published in 1998 by Gauntlet Press. The title is a play on the song "Are You Lonesome Tonight?," made famous by Elvis Presley, and a reference to the inner groove etching of the 1986 single "Ask" by The Smiths.

Stories 
Introduction by Peter Straub
"In Vermis Veritas"
"Arise"
"Saved" (with Christa Faust)
"King of the Cats" (with David Ferguson)
"Self-Made Man"
"Pin Money"
"America"
"Entertaining Mr. Orton"
"Monday's Special (A Dr. Brite story)"
"Vine of the Soul"
"Mussolini and the Axeman's Jazz"
"Are You Loathsome Tonight?"
"...And in Closing (For Now)" by Caitlín R. Kiernan

References 

1998 short story collections
Short story collections by Poppy Z. Brite
Cultural depictions of Elvis Presley